Nabi Alekber oghlu Babayev (December 10, 1924 – January 15, 2007), better known as Nabi Khazri, was an Azerbaijani poet, playwright, publicist, translator and screenwriter.

Biography
Nabi Khazri was born on December 10, 1924, in the village of Khirdalan to a merchant family. His father, Karbalai Alekber Baba oghlu (1873–1933) was a merchant. Khazri graduated from secondary school and began his career. After participating in the Second World War in 1942–1943, he worked as editor at the editorial office of the "Communist" newspaper in 1943–1945 and worked as broadcaster at "Azerbaijan radio". At the age of 20 he was invited to the Union of Writers by Samad Vurgun. He studied at Azerbaijan State University in 1945–1947, at Leningrad State University in 1947–1949, and Maxim Gorky Literature Institute in 1949–1952. After completing his education in 1952, Nabi Khazri worked as consultant at Azerbaijan Writers Union until 1957 and in 1957–1958 as literary worker at the editorial office of the "Literature and Art" newspaper. He worked as the secretary of the Union of Writers of Azerbaijan in 1958–1965, chairman of the Azerbaijan State Television and Radio Broadcasting Committee in 1965–1971, and Deputy Minister of Culture of Azerbaijan in 1971–1974. Since 1974, Nabi Khazri, chairman of the presidium of the Society for Friendship and Cultural Relations with Foreign Countries of Azerbaijan which were renamed "The World of Azerbaijan" International Relations Center in 1992.

Nabi Khazri died of acute ischemic stroke at 10:45 am on January 15, 2007, and was buried on 1st Alley of Honor on January 16.

Works
His first book of poems, "Prosperous Dreams" was published in 1950. Nabi Khazri was the author of "Years and coasts" (1969), "Caravan of the stars " (1979), "Generations-centuries" (1985), "White lightnings" (1986), "I swear on the soil" (1989), "The leaves of the plane tree" (1995), "The bloody tulips of the Century" (1996) and other books. Nabi Khazri's poems have been translated and published in many different languages. His literary translations have enabled Azerbaijani readers to get acquainted with poetry of the world. A book of selected works by Nabi Khazri was also published in Tehran in 1988 by transferring it to the Arabic alphabet by Piruz Dilanchi.

Filmography
"10 minutes poetry" (film, 1965) (short documentary film) (author of the work)
"Flourishing Absheron" (film, 1967) (television movie) – scriptwriter
"Coastal Garden" (film, 1967) – scriptwriter
"The Summit Cloud" (film, 1972)
"I want to understand" (film, 1980) – author, screenwriter
"Poetry is a universe for me" (film, 1984)
"Nabi Khazri" (film, 1987)
"The khazri of the poetry " (film, 2000)
"Horsemen of Attila" (film, 2002)

Awards
Nabi Khazri was awarded several orders and medals for his literary and social activities, including the highest state awards and orders of the Republic of Azerbaijan.

 USSR State Prize
 Lenin Komsomol Prize
 Azerbaijan SSR State Prize
 Order of Lenin
 Order of the Red Banner of Labour – 1975
 Honored Art Worker of the Azerbaijan SSR – July 30, 1979
 Shohrat Order – December 17, 1995
 Istiglal Order
 Order of Saints Cyril and Methodius (Bulgaria)

References

1924 births
2007 deaths
20th-century Azerbaijani poets
20th-century Azerbaijani writers
20th-century male writers
20th-century pseudonymous writers
20th-century screenwriters
20th-century translators
21st-century Azerbaijani poets
21st-century Azerbaijani writers
21st-century male writers
21st-century pseudonymous writers
21st-century screenwriters
21st-century translators
Writers from Baku
Communist Party of the Soviet Union members
Maxim Gorky Literature Institute alumni
Honored Art Workers of the Azerbaijan SSR
Recipients of the Istiglal Order
Recipients of the Shohrat Order
Recipients of the Lenin Komsomol Prize
Recipients of the Order of Lenin
Recipients of the Order of the Red Banner of Labour
Recipients of the USSR State Prize
Azerbaijani-language poets
Azerbaijani-language writers
Socialist realism writers
Azerbaijani dramatists and playwrights
Azerbaijani male poets
Azerbaijani male writers
Azerbaijani publicists
Azerbaijani screenwriters
Azerbaijani translators
Soviet dramatists and playwrights
Soviet male poets
Soviet male writers
Soviet screenwriters
Soviet translators
Burials at Alley of Honor